Odai Eid is a Syrian football player who is currently playing for Tishreen.

He played for Al Karamah in the 2008 AFC Champions League knockout stages.

References

1986 births
Living people
Association football midfielders
Syrian footballers
Al-Karamah players
Tishreen SC players
Syrian Premier League players